The Thief (Vor) is a 1997 Russian drama film written and directed by Pavel Chukhray. It was nominated for the Academy Award for Best Foreign Language Film and won the Nika Award for Best Picture and Best Directing. Also winner of the International Youth Jury's prize, the President of the Italian Senate's Gold Medal, and the UNICEF Award at the 1997 Venice Film Festival.

The film is about a young woman, Katya (Yekaterina Rednikova), and her 6-year-old son Sanya (Misha Philipchuk), who, in 1952, meet a veteran Soviet officer named Tolyan (Vladimir Mashkov). Katya falls in love with Tolyan, who turns out to be a small time criminal, but who also becomes a father figure to Sanya.

Plot

Katya, a poor and desperate widow, and her young son, Sanya, try to survive in the post-World War II Soviet Union during the early 1950s. While on a train, the two meet a handsome, "rakish" officer, Tolyan, who seduces the mother. Katya stays with Tolyan, who pretends to be her husband and acts as a stepfather to Sanya, who is at first highly distrustful of the man, resenting his presence and authority. There are several allusions to Hamlet.

Through his good looks, apparent generosity, and his status as a war veteran, Tolyan charms his way into a variety of situations that enable him to rob people. Katya and Sanya both realize the harsh and increasingly abusive nature of the new head of their family, but, although alarmed, neither mother nor child seem willing to leave the man. The extent of Tolyan's love for his new family remains ambiguous throughout the film and provides one of the more compelling elements of the story.

Cast
Vladimir Mashkov as Tolyan
Yekaterina Rednikova as Katya
Misha Philipchuk as Sanya (as Misha Filipchuk)
Amaliya Mordvinova as the doctor's wife
Lidiya Savchenko as Baba Tanya
Yuliya Artamonova as the engineer's wife
Yury Belyayev as Sanya (at 48 years old)
Dmitri Chigaryov as Sanya (at 12 years old)
Anton Tabakov (as A. Tabakov)

Reception

Critical response
The Thief has an approval rating of 88% on review aggregator website Rotten Tomatoes, based on 24 reviews, and an average rating of 6.99/10.The website's critical consensus states,"As beautiful to look at as it is thought-provoking, The Thief interrogates Europe's past through the experiences of a family in crisis".

Awards

Won
  Sozvezdie 1997:
 Best Actor - Vladimir Mashkov
 Venice Film Festival 1997:
 Prize of the International Youth Jury - Pavel Chukhray
 President of the Italian Senate's Gold Medal - Pavel Chukhray
UNICEF Award - Pavel Chukhray
 Open CIS and Baltik Film Festival 1997:
 Best Actor - Vladimir Mashkov
 Best Director - Pavel Chukhray
 Prize of the Distributors Jury - Pavel Chukhray
 Nika Awards 1998:
 Best Actor - Vladimir Mashkov
 Best Actress - Ekaterina Rednikova
 Best Director - Pavel Chukhray
 Best Film - Pavel Chukhray and Igor Tolstunov
 Best Music - Vladimir Dashkevich
 Young Artist Award 1998:
 Best Young Performer in a Foreign Film - Misha Philipchuk

Nominated
 Venice Film Festival 1997:
 Golden Lion - Pavel Chukhray
 European Film Awards 1997:
 Best Film - Igor Tolstunov
 Golden Globe Award
 Golden Globe for Best Foreign Language Film - Russia
 Academy Award 1998:
 Oscar Award for Best Foreign Language Film - Russia
 Nika Awards 1998:
 Best Cinematographer - Vladimir Klimov
 Best Costume Designer - Natalya Moneva
 Best Production Designer - Viktor Petrov
 Best Screenplay - Pavel Chukhray
 Best Sound - Yuliya Yegorova
 Goya Awards 1999:
 Best European Film - Pavel Chukhray

See also
 List of submissions to the 70th Academy Awards for Best Foreign Language Film
 List of Russian submissions for the Academy Award for Best Foreign Language Film

References

External links

1997 films
1997 crime drama films
Russian crime drama films
1990s Russian-language films
Films about the Soviet Union in the Stalin era
Films set in 1952
Films set in 1958
Films set in 1994
Films set in Russia
Films shot in Yaroslavl Oblast